George Sprague Myers (February 2, 1905 – November 4, 1985) was an American ichthyologist who spent most of his career at Stanford University. He served as the editor of Stanford Ichthyological Bulletin as well as president of the American Society of Ichthyologists and Herpetologists. Myers was also head of the Division of Fishes at the United States National Museum, and held a position as an ichthyologist for the United States Fish and Wildlife Service. He was also an advisor in fisheries and ichthyology to the Brazilian Government.

He was a prolific writer of papers and books and is well known to aquarists as the man who first described numerous popular aquarium species such as the flame tetra (Hyphessobrycon flammeus), the black-winged hatchetfish (Carnegiella marthae), the ram cichlid (Microgeophagus ramirezi) and, most notably, the neon tetra. He also erected the genera Aphyosemion and Fundulopanchax, which include dozens of widely kept killifish species. He is perhaps best known to aquarists for his collaborations with William T. Innes who wrote the classic book Exotic Aquarium Fishes. Myers served as the scientific consultant for this seminal work in the aquarium literature and, after Innes retired, served as the editor for later editions. When Myers described the neon tetra in 1936, he named it Hyphessobrycon innesi in honor of Innes. The species was later moved to the genus Paracheirodon and is now known as Paracheirodon innesi.

He was an ichthyologist with the 1938 Allan Hancock Pacific Expedition. He participated as a biologist in the U.S. Navy's 1947 Bikini Scientific Resurvey.

Myers worked closely with fellow ichthyologist and Stanford Natural History Museum curator, Margaret Hamilton Storey.

Taxon named in his honor 
In the scientific field of herpetology his major interest was amphibians. 
A genus of Philippine snake, Myersophis, was named in his honor by Edward Harrison Taylor in 1963. 
A genus of South Pacific lizards, Geomyersia, was named in his honor by Allen E. Greer and Fred Parker in 1968.

Taxon described by him
See :Category:Taxa named by George S. Myers

References

Further reading

External links
Smithsonian Institution Archives
George Sprague Myers Papers, c. 1922-1985
George Sprague Myers Papers, circa 1903-1986 and undated

American ichthyologists
1905 births
1985 deaths
Stanford University Department of Biology faculty
20th-century American zoologists